Frovina indecora is a species of predatory sea snail, a marine gastropod mollusk in the family Zerotulidae.

Distribution

Description 

Habitat 
Minimum recorded depth is 311 m. Maximum recorded depth is 426 m.

References

Zerotulidae
Gastropods described in 1912